This is a list of castles in Venezuela.

References 

Venezuela
Castles
Venezuela
Castles